Crime is one of the most urgent concerns facing Mexico, as Mexican drug trafficking rings play a major role in the flow of cocaine, methamphetamine, fentanyl, heroin, and marijuana transiting between Latin America and the United States. Drug trafficking has led to corruption, which has had a deleterious effect on Mexico's Federal Representative Republic. Drug trafficking and organized crime have been a major source of violent crime in Mexico. Drug cartels and gangs have also branched out to conduct alternative illegal activities for profit, including sex trafficking in Mexico. Some of the most increasingly violent states in Mexico in 2020 included Guanajuato, Zacatecas, Michoacán, Jalisco, and Querétaro. Some of the world's most violent cities are reportedly within the state of Guanajuato with extortion from criminal groups (such as CSRL and CJNG) now being commonplace. The state of Zacatecas is said to be valuable to multiple organized crime groups (including the Sinaloa Cartel and CJNG) for drug trafficking, specifically methamphetamine to the United States. As of 2021, Michoacán is experiencing increased instances of extortion and kidnapping due to a growing presence and escalation in the armed conflicts between CJNG and Cárteles Unidos on regions bordering the neighboring state of Jalisco. CJNG is also currently battling the Los Chapitos faction of the Sinaloa Cartel in the North Mexican region of Sonora.

Mexico has experienced increasingly high crime rates, especially in major urban centers. The country's great economic polarization has stimulated criminal activity mainly in the lower socioeconomic strata, which include the majority of the country's population. Crime is increasing at high levels, and is repeatedly marked by violence, especially in the cities of Tijuana and Ciudad Juárez, and the states of Baja California, Durango, Sinaloa, Guerrero, Chihuahua, Michoacán, Tamaulipas, and Nuevo León. Other metropolitan areas have lower, yet still serious, levels of crime. Low apprehension and conviction rates contribute to the high crime rate. Since many crimes go unreported, the rates may be much higher than reported by the government. The murder rate in 2015 was 14 per 100,000. Most of the crime is committed by a small proportion of the population involved in the drug trade with about half of murders drug related.

Assault and theft make up the vast majority of crimes. While urban areas tend to have higher crime rates, as is typical in most countries, the United States–Mexico border has also been a problematic area. In 2017, Mexico witnessed a record number of murders  with 29,158 homicides recorded.

Mexico is Latin America's most dangerous country for journalists according to the Global Criminality Index 2016. Many of these crimes go unpunished, which has led to campaigns in the press and demonstrations highlighting the supposed 'impunity' of those responsible for murdering investigative journalists.

Crime by type

Murder 

In 2012, Mexico had a murder rate of 21.5 per 100,000 population. There were a total of 26,037 murders in Mexico in 2012.
Between 2000 and 2013, 215,000 people in Mexico were murdered. By 2013 there were only 30,800 people incarcerated for murder, showing that many murders go unsolved. In October 2017, Mexico suffered its deadliest month since it started keeping such data in 1997, with 2,371 murder investigations. 2017 was Mexico's deadliest year on record, with 31,174 murders recorded, leading to a murder rate of 25 per 100,000 inhabitants in 2017, compared with 19.4 in 2011. In May 2018, Mexico broke the previous deadliest month on record set in October with 2,530 reported cases of intentional homicides during the month, or 93 per day. In 2018, Mexico broke the previous deadliest year record, with Mexican authorities opened 33,341 murder investigations in 2018, the highest number ever. However in 2019, homicides were on track to reach 35,000 in 2019 which is even higher than the 2018 year record.

By states 

The state of Chihuahua ranked number one with the most homicide in the country, the least was Baja California Sur.

Drug trafficking 

The United States is a lucrative market for  illegal drugs. The United Nations estimates that nearly 90% of cocaine sold in the United States originates in South America and is smuggled through Mexico. Mexico is the largest foreign supplier of marijuana and the largest source of heroin for the U.S. market. The majority of methamphetamine sold in the United States is made in Mexico, and Mexican-run methamphetamine labs that operate north of the border account for much of the remainder.

Drug cartels 
Mexican drug cartels play a major role in the flow of cocaine, heroin, and marijuana transiting between Latin America and the United States. These drug cartels often use Mexican-American and other Latino gangs to distribute their narcotics in United States.

Mexican drug cartels also have ties to Colombian drug traffickers, and other international organized crime. A sharp spike in drug-related violence has some analysts worrying about the 'Colombianization' of Mexico.

Domestic production of illegal drugs 

Some illegal drugs are also produced in Mexico, including significant amounts of opium poppy, and marijuana in the western Sierra Madre Mountains region.
Mexico has increasingly become a major producer of amphetamines and other synthetic drugs in the North American market (e.g. crystal), especially in the states of Guerrero, Michoacán, Jalisco and the Distrito Federal. Since early 2007, the export of manufactured drugs has been controlled by the Beltran-Leyva brothers (Sonora-Sinaloa-DF) and "la Familia de Michoacán". These two crime groups have controlled the corridors from the deep sea port of Lázaro Cárdenas in Michoacán, where precursor products to manufacture synthetic drugs are imported from Asia.

Domestic consumption of illegal drugs 
Marijuana, crack cocaine, methamphetamine, and other drugs are increasingly consumed in Mexico, especially by youths in urban areas and northern parts of the country.

Corruption 

High levels of corruption in the police, judiciary, and government in general have contributed greatly to the crime problem. Corruption is a significant obstacle to Mexico's achieving a stable democracy.

Mexico is ranked the 138th least corrupt country in the world which makes them less corrupt than Papua New Guinea but more corrupt than Lebanon. This is according to the Corruption Perceptions Index, which is based on 13 different surveys and includes police, business, and political corruption.

Corruption in law enforcement 

The war was characterized by a backlash against the active student movement of the late 1960s which ended in the Tlatelolco massacre at a 1968 student rally in Mexico City.

The organization of police forces in Mexico is complex; each police force has a different level of jurisdiction and authority, and those levels often overlap. The Procuraduría General de la República (Federal Attorney General's office) along with the law enforcement agencies Policia Federal Preventiva and Agencia Federal de Investigación, has responsibility for overseeing law enforcements across the entire country. In addition, there are several police organizations at the state, district, and city level. Since pay is generally poor (U.S.$285–$400 per month), police officers are more likely to accept bribes to protect criminals or ignore crime entirely. Law enforcement personnel are often presented with the option of choosing "Plata o Plomo"; meaning they can either accept a bribe (plata, for silver) or they will be killed (plomo, for lead).

Corruption plagues the various levels of police, and is frequently difficult to track down and prosecute since police officers may be protected by district attorneys and other members of the judiciary. The problem is especially pronounced in northern border areas such as Tijuana, where police are engaged by drug traffickers to protect and enforce their illicit interests.

The Mexican police force often do not investigate crimes, will generally randomly select someone to be the guilty party then fabricate the evidence. This issue is a major problem throughout Mexico as many of the actual police force are the ones involved in the crimes or are trying to cover up their poor policing work.

Corruption in the judiciary 
A United Nations Special Rapporteur undertook a mission to Mexico in 2002 to investigate reports by the United Nations Commission on Human Rights that the country's judiciary and administration of law was not independent. During the course of his visit to a number of cities, the rapporteur observed that corruption in the judiciary had not been reduced significantly. One of the principal issues is that, because the federal courts operate at a relatively high level, most citizens are compelled to seek justice in the inadequate state courts.

Additionally, the rapporteur expressed concerns about such issues as disorganization in the legal profession, difficulties and harassment faced by lawyers, poor trial procedures, poor access to the justice system for indigenous peoples and minors, and lacklustre investigation of many crimes.

Violent crime against journalists 

A significant increase in violent crime against journalists has been encountered in the country in recent years. Although the problem has existed since at least 1970, the amount of violence against journalist has intensified since the beginning of the Mexican Drug War, with at least 90 journalists murdered or disappeared in Mexico since 2006. Few of the perpetrators have been brought to justice. One of the more prominent cases was that of syndicated columnist Francisco Arratia Saldierna, a prominent and well-known journalist who wrote a column called Portavoz (or "Spokesman"). The column featured topics such as corruption, organized crime, and drug trafficking.

Arratia's murder, which was particularly brutal, and others like it, sparked demands from other journalists that then-President Vicente Fox do more to enforce security and bring those responsible for the murders to justice. In 2004, a group of 215 reporters and editors sent an urgent letter to President Fox and other federal authorities, demanding that they address these concerns. The letter represented a massive communication effort coming from professionals from 19 of the nation's 31 states. The key demand was that violent crimes against journalists be made federal crimes, so they would be investigated and prosecuted by federal officers and not by local officials whom the letter claims could be the same people who commit the crimes.

The effect of these crimes has been the self-censorship of many journalists, due to fears of retribution from criminals. The situation has earned attention from prominent global organizations such as the office of the United Nations High Commissioner for Human Rights (OHCHR) and the Center for Journalism and Public Ethics (CEPET). Amerigo Incalcaterra of the OHCHR advocated the protection of journalists and the preservation of freedom of speech, calling it "essential for the consolidation of democracy and the rule of law in this country".

Forced disappearance 

Over 30,000 people in Mexico have been reported missing in 2016.

Sex trafficking and slavery

Mexican citizens and foreigners have been victims of sex trafficking in Mexico. Drug cartels and gangs fighting in the Mexican War on Drugs have relied on trafficking as an alternative source of profit to fund their operations. The cartels and gangs also abduct women and girls to use as their personal sex slaves.

Violence against women 

As of 2014, Mexico has the 16th highest rate of homicides committed against women in the world. This rate has been on the rise since 2007.

According to the 2013 Human Rights Watch, many women do not seek out legal redress after being victims of domestic violence and sexual assault because "the severity of punishments for some sexual offenses contingent on the "chastity" of the victim" and "those who do report them are generally met with suspicion, apathy, and disrespect."

According to a 1997 study by Kaja Finkler, domestic abuse "is embedded in gender and marital relations fostered in Mexican women's dependence on their spouses for subsistence and for self-esteem, sustained by ideologies of romantic love, by family structure and residential arrangements."

Gender violence is more prevalent in regions along the Mexico-US border and in areas of high drug trading activity and drug violence. The phenomenon of the female homicides in Ciudad Juárez involves the violent deaths of hundreds of women and girls since 1993 in the northern Mexican region of Ciudad Juárez, Chihuahua, a border city across the Rio Grande from the U.S. city of El Paso, Texas. As of February 2005, the number of murdered women in Ciudad Juarez since 1993 is estimated to be more than 370.

In 2005, journalist Lydia Cacho published a book, Demons of Eden, exposing Mexican politicians and business leaders' large roles in a child sex trade spanning Mexico. She was abducted and harassed by police officers in response.

Women in the Mexican Drug War (2006–present) have been raped, tortured, and murdered in the conflict.

By location

Mexico City 

Between 2000 and 2004 an average of 478 crimes were reported each day in Mexico City. The actual crime rate is thought to be much higher "since most people are reluctant to report crime." Under policies enacted by Mayor Marcelo Ebrard between 2009 and 2011, Mexico City underwent a major security upgrade with violent and petty crime rates both falling significantly despite the rise in violent crime in other parts of the country. Some of the policies enacted included the installation of 11,000 security cameras around the city and a very large expansion of the city police force.

Mexico City currently has one of the highest police officer to resident ratios in the world, with one uniformed police officer per every 100 citizens. The murder rate in 2009 was 8.4 per 100,000 — by comparison, higher than the 5.6 in New York City but much less than the 14.8 in Atlanta.

In Mexico City, the area of Iztapalapa has the highest rates of rape, violence against women, and domestic violence in the capital.

Crime reporting and sentencing rate 

According to the CNDH, only one out of every ten crimes is reported in Mexico; this is due to lack of trust from citizens to the authorities. Furthermore, only one out of 100 reported crimes actually goes to sentencing.

Effects on tourism 
Mexico is a major tourist destination, with 42 million people traveling there in 2018; US citizens alone usually make up 15–16 million annually. Because cartel-related violence in Mexico is highly geographically limited, the US State department has issued "do not travel" advisories for only five states as of November 2021: Colima, Guerrero, Michoacán, Sinaloa and Tamaulipas. Even in areas with high levels of violent crime, tourists are rarely targeted as conflicts are usually between rival gangs and/or the police. Pickpocketing and other forms of petty theft are generally the main concerns for travelers to Mexico. Before the COVID-19 pandemic in 2020, tourist numbers were increasing.

In 2015, Verdugo-Yepes, Pedroni and Hu applied a panel structural vector autoregression model to model the effects of crime on GDP growth and foreign direct investment (FDI) at the state and national level.

Chela Rivas, a Mexican singer and performer, stated in 2020 that "because of the war with drug cartels, each day it becomes more and more dangerous to ... travel to remote towns and sing. It is not only frustrating, it is scary."

Efforts to combat crime

Law enforcement initiatives 

Mexican law enforcement is divided between federal, state, and municipal entities. Estimates range between 1,600 and 3,000 different police forces in total. There are over 350,000 police agents in Mexico.

At all levels, policing in Mexico tends to maintain separate forces for patrol/response (preventive) policing on the one hand and investigative (judicial) policing on the other.

Federal forces at the border 
In June 2005, the government deployed federal forces to three states to contain surging violence linked to organized crime. At a news conference in Mexico City, presidential spokesman Rubén Aguilar told reporters that the new deployment was the result of evidence that organized crime has penetrated some local police departments.

Technology in Tijuana 
In response to a rise in violent crime in the region of Tijuana, considered one of the five most violent areas of the country by the U.S. State Department, mayor Jorge Hank Rhon deployed a massive technology update to the city's police force in February 2006. The technology includes surveillance equipment, handheld computers, and alarm systems. Since tourism is a staple of the economy in Tijuana, the mayor has tried to make reforms to highlight the safety of tourist areas.Tijuana has installed a sophisticated public-security system, but city officials don't seem to know details about how it is funded or the background of the company that supplied it.

Political initiatives 
President Vicente Fox took power in December 2000 promising to crack down on crime and improve a judicial system rife with corruption and ineptitude. Upon taking office, he established a new ministry of Security and Police, doubled the pay for police officers, and committed to other ethics reforms. President Fox also cited drug trafficking and drug consumption as the top cross-border priority issue.

During the first three years of Fox's government, the official number of reported kidnappings showed a slight decrease, from 505 in 2001 to 438 in 2003. The new Federal Investigation Agency (Procuraduria de Justicia) reported dismantling 48 kidnapping rings and saving 419 victims.

Cooperation with the United States 
In 1996, Mexico changed its policy to allow extradition of its citizens to the United States to face trial. Previously, the Constitution had forbidden its citizens to be extradited.

In 2005, the U.S. State Department defended efforts by the two countries to reduce violence and drug trafficking on the border following decisions by governors in the U.S. states of Arizona and New Mexico to declare an emergency in their border counties. The two governors stated, "the federal government's inability to control crime and violence related to illegal immigration had forced them to take matters into their own hands". The Mexican government criticized the emergency declarations.

The U.S. state of Texas and Mexican police officials held a conference in San Antonio to discuss ways of coordinating efforts to stop crime but there are questions about how successful the program will be.

Many Mexican police officials in border towns have been targets of assassination by drug cartels, who have even threatened local law enforcement in the United States. In January 2003, the security consulting company of former New York City Mayor Rudolph Giuliani was hired by business leaders to come up with a plan to clean up Mexico City, which has the second-highest crime rate in Latin America.

Social initiatives

Protest march against crime 
In June 2004, at least a million people marched through the Mexican capital and other cities to protest the failure of federal and local governments to control crime in one of the world's most crime-ridden countries.

In 2008, a second civilian protest was made after independent NGOs exhorted the public, again, at least one million people attended over Mexico City and other major cities all across Mexico. On this second march candles were lit and the national anthem was played. The protest generated more public attention perhaps because in this same year, a 12-year-old son of the Marti family, owners of a prominent well-known sports gear business, was abducted and murdered. In the same year, a similar situation occurred to the 19-year-old daughter of Nelson Vargas, a businessman and former government representative. These two cases brought great public attention since the scale of crime and violence was very rare to hit over certain social groups, being these amongst the most remarkable exemptions.

Human rights violations 
In its effort to combat crime, the Mexican army was accused of crimes against of humanity by several NGOs. In September 2014, several Mexican human rights groups and International Federation for Human Rights, had filed a complaint with the office of the prosecutor of the International Criminal Court, asking it to investigate the “systematic and widespread” abuse of thousands of civilians by the army and the police in their fight against organized crime.

See also 

 Gun politics in Mexico
 International child abduction in Mexico
 Presumed Guilty, a 2009 Mexican documentary film

Mexican Drug War:
 List of Mexico's 37 most-wanted drug lords
 Miguel Ángel Félix Gallardo
 Guadalajara Cartel
 Sinaloa Cartel
 Jalisco New Generation Cartel
 Gulf Cartel
 Juárez Cartel
 Los Zetas
 Tijuana Cartel
 El Narco: Inside Mexico's Criminal Insurgency

References

Other references

External links 

 Mexico Black Markets Havocscope Black Markets
 Mexico: An Embattled Country from the Dean Peter Krogh Foreign Affairs Digital Archives
 Mexico page on InSight Crime Ongoing reporting on Mexico's drug war and involved cartels.
 Mexican Crime Stats NationMaster
 Mexican Crime Statistics and Analysis Center for Economic Research and Education (CIDE)
 Organized Crime and Terrorist Activity in Mexico, 1999–2002 Library of Congress
 Potent Mexican Meth Floods In as States Curb Domestic Variety New York Times
 The Best Page about Mexican Crime Statistics Actualized to 2011 in some cases